Satyr is an American progressive, post-hardcore band from Atlanta, Georgia composed of vocalists and guitarists Michael Campbell, Janald Long, and drummer Brody Taylor Smith, who are currently signed to Kill Iconic Records. To date, they have released two studio albums, their acclaimed independent debut, Locus (2020) and most recent follow-up, Totem (2022).

History
Formed in 2016, Satyr started as the bedroom musical project of main songwriter Michael "Soup" Campbell while attending Georgia State University. Wanting to create rock music that was technically proficient with strong melodies and structure, Campbell began creating material and performing with a few classmates, which included original bassist, Calvin Cox during their early formation. After a few months of rotating members and continued songwriting, a high school acquaintance of Campbell's—drummer Brody Taylor Smith and a friend of Cox—lead vocalist and guitarist Janald Long joined.

With a solidified lineup, the group began recording material with Atlanta engineer and producer, Corey Bautista in 2017. On February 28, 2018, the band self-released their debut EP, Neutrino!, preceded by the single "Andromeda" on January 20, 2018. After the EP's release, Satyr focused on out-of-state performances and shared the stage with such acts as Eidola, Tera Melos, Good Tiger, Strawberry Girls, and Icarus the Owl despite being an unsigned act.

On February 21, 2020, Satyr released Locus, their debut studio album recorded and produced by Bautista. The album was preceded by three singles: "Picayune", "Bird", and "Aesop". On May 26, 2021, the group revealed that they had begun recording material with Bautista for their second full-length record. One month later, Satyr announced that they had signed to Kill Iconic, a start-up record label founded by Hail The Sun's drummer and frontman, Donovan Melero.

During September 2021, it was revealed Calvin Cox had left the group to complete university and pursue a career in business computing after receiving a reply from a fan questioning his absence from a YouTube community post detailing the band's progress on their next LP. It was further stated, they would continue as a trio and recruit a new bassist for live performances, who was later revealed to be Ryne Jones, a local Atlanta musician and friend of the band. Satyr concluded the rest of that year, touring as support acts for The Fall of Troy's "Doppelgänger" 16th Anniversary and Intervals U.S Winter 2021 tours respectively.

On May 6, 2022, the band announced their second studio album, Totem, which released July 1, 2022 via Kill Iconic Records. The lead single, "Vector" was released alongside the announcement. The album's second single, "Attrition" was released on June 3, 2022.

Musical style and influences
The band's music has been characterized as post-hardcore blended with progressive metal, mathcore, and djent rhythms performed with technical intricacy and complex song structures into a unique sound. Most notably, the fluid interchanging clean and scream vocals by Long and Campbell respectively add a contrasting yet complementary dynamic signature to their sound.

Collectively, the group has cited bands such as Dance Gavin Dance, Hail The Sun, The Fall of Troy, Veil of Maya, Periphery, The Dillinger Escape Plan and Meshuggah as influential to their sound.

Members

Current
 Michael "Soup" Campbell – unclean vocals, guitar , bass 
 Janald "JD" Long – clean vocals, guitar 

Former
 Calvin "Dolphin" Cox  – bass 
 Brody Taylor Smith – drums, percussion 

Touring
 Ryne "Pork" Jones – bass 
 James Knoerl – drums

Discography

Studio albums
Locus (2020)
Totem (2022)

Extended plays
Neutrino! (2018)

References

External links
Official website

Musical groups from Atlanta
Musical groups established in 2017
2017 establishments in Georgia (U.S. state)